Michael Schoenmaker (born 3 February 1983) is a Dutch Paralympic swimmer. He represented the Netherlands at the 2012 Summer Paralympics and at the 2016 Summer Paralympics.

At the 2012 Summer Paralympics held in London, United Kingdom, he won the gold medal in the men's 50 metre breaststroke SB3 event.

At the 2016 Summer Paralympics held in Rio de Janeiro, Brazil, he won the silver medal in the men's 200 metre freestyle S4 event and the bronze medal in the men's 100 metre freestyle S4 event.

References

External links 
 

Living people
1983 births
Sportspeople from Roosendaal
Dutch male freestyle swimmers
Dutch male breaststroke swimmers
Paralympic swimmers of the Netherlands
Paralympic gold medalists for the Netherlands
Paralympic silver medalists for the Netherlands
Paralympic bronze medalists for the Netherlands
Paralympic medalists in swimming
Swimmers at the 2012 Summer Paralympics
Swimmers at the 2016 Summer Paralympics
Medalists at the 2012 Summer Paralympics
Medalists at the 2016 Summer Paralympics
Medalists at the World Para Swimming European Championships
S4-classified Paralympic swimmers
20th-century Dutch people
21st-century Dutch people